Macroschisma, common name the narrow slot limpets,  is a genus of sea snails, marine gastropod mollusks in the family Fissurellidae, the keyhole limpets and slit limpets.

Species
Species within the genus Macroschisma include:
Macroschisma africanum Tomlin, 1932
 Macroschisma angustatum A. Adams, 1851
Macroschisma bakiei Adams in Sowerby, 1862
Macroschisma compressum Adams, 1850
Macroschisma cuspidatum Adams, 1851
Macroschisma dilatatum Adams, 1851
Macroschisma elegans Preston, 1908
 Macroschisma hiatula Swainson, 1840
 Macroschisma madreporaria Hedley, 1907
Macroschisma maximum Adams, 1851
Macroschisma megatrema Adams, 1851
Macroschisma munitum (Iredale, 1940)
Macroschisma productum Adams, 1850
Macroschisma rubrum Poppe, Tagaro & Stahlschmidt, 2015 
 Macroschisma scutiformis G. Nevill & H. Nevill, 1869
Macroschisma sinense Adams, 1855
Macroschisma tasmaniae (Sowerby, 1862)

Species brought into synonymy
Macroschisma africana (sic): synonym of Macroschisma africanum Tomlin, 1932
Macroschisma canalifera (Nevill & H. Nevill, 1869): synonym of Lucapinella canalifera (G. Nevill & H. Nevill, 1869)
Macroschisma compressa (sic): synonym of Macroschisma compressum Adams, 1850
Macroschisma cuspidata (sic): synonym of Macroschisma cuspidatum Adams, 1851
Macroschisma dilatata (sic): synonym of Macroschisma dilatatum Adams, 1851
Macroschisma magathura (sic): synonym of Macroschisma megatrema Adams, 1851
Macroschisma maxima [sic] : synonym of Macroschisma maximum Adams, 1851
Macroschisma munita (sic): synonym of Macroschisma munitum (Iredale, 1940)
Macroschisma producta (sic): synonym of  Macroschisma productum Adams, 1850
Macroschisma sinensis [sic] : synonym of Macroschisma sinense Adams, 1855

References

 Cotton, B. C., 1959. South Australian Mollusca. Archaeogastropoda. W.L. Hawes, Adelaide.. 449 pp., 1 pl.
 Iredale, T. & McMichael, D.F., 1962 [31/Dec/1962]. A reference list of the marine Mollusca of New South Wales. Mem. Aust. Mus., 11:0-0
 Macpherson, J.H. & Gabriel, C.J., 1962. Marine Molluscs of Victoria. Melbourne University Press and National Museum of Victoria, Melbourne. xv, 475
 Wilson, B., 1993. Australian Marine Shells. Prosobranch Gastropods. Odyssey Publishing, Kallaroo, WA

External links
 Herbert D.G. (2015). An annotated catalogue and bibliography of the taxonomy, synonymy and distribution of the Recent Vetigastropoda of South Africa (Mollusca). Zootaxa. 4049(1): 1-98
[https://www.ncbi.nlm.nih.gov/Taxonomy/Browser/wwwtax.cgi?id=173514&lvl=0 To GenBank 
To ITIS
To World Register of Marine Species

Gastropod genera
Taxa named by John Edward Gray